YBN may refer to:

 YBN (collective), an American rap collective
 YBN University, a private school in Ranchi, Jharkhand, India
 Yardbarker Network (YBN), an American sports blog network
 Young British Naturists (YBN), the under-30 wing of the nudist organization
 ISO 639:ybn, ISO code for the Yabaâna language